Triloculinoides is a genus of Miocene to recent forams, included in the miliolid family Haurinidae, resembling Triloculina except for the aperture, which in the adult stage the forks of the bifid tooth join to form a ring.

Triloculinoides has been found in Australia, the Sea of Japan, the Okhotsk Sea and Greenland Sea.

References 

 Alfred R. Loeblich Jr and Helen Tappan,1988. Forminiferal Genera and their Classification. e-book 

Tubothalamea
Foraminifera genera
Extant Miocene first appearances